The UK Vaccination Acts of 1840, 1853, 1867 and 1898 were a series of legislative Acts passed by the Parliament of the United Kingdom regarding the vaccination policy of the country.

Provisions

The 1840 Act
The Vaccination Act 1840:
 Made variolation illegal.
 Provided optional vaccination free of charge.

In general, the disadvantages of variolation are the same as those of vaccination, but added to them is the general agreement that variolation was always more dangerous than vaccination.

Vaccination was first made compulsory in 1852, and the provisions were made more stringent in 1867, 1871, and 1874.

The 1853 Act
By the Act of 1853 it was required:
 That every child, whose health permits, shall be vaccinated within three, or in case of orphanage within four months of birth, by the public vaccinator of the district, or by some other medical practitioner.
 That notice of this requirement, and information as to the local arrangements for public vaccination, shall, whenever a birth is registered, be given by the registrar of births to the parents or guardians of the child.
 That every medical practitioner who, whether in public or private practice, successfully vaccinates a child shall send to the local registrar of births a certificate that he has done so; and the registrar shall keep a minute of all the notices given, and an account of all the certificates thus received.
 That parents or guardians who, without sufficient reason, after having duly received the registrar's notice of the requirement of Vaccination, either omit to have a child duly vaccinated, or, this being done, omit to have it inspected as to the results of vaccination, shall be liable to a penalty of £1; and all penalties shall be recoverable under Jervis's Act, and shall be paid toward the local poor-rate.

The 1867 Act 
The Vaccination Act 1867 (30 & 31 Vict. c. 84) consolidated and updated the existing laws relating to vaccination, and was repealed by the National Health Service Act 1946.

The poor-law guardians were to control vaccination districts formed out of the parishes, and pay vaccinators from 1s to 3s per child vaccinated in the district (the amount paid varied with how far they had to travel).

Within seven days of the birth of a child being registered, the registrar was to deliver a notice of vaccination; if the child was not presented to be vaccinated within three months, or brought for inspection afterwards, the parents or guardians were liable to a summary conviction and fine of 20s.

The Act also provided that any person who produced or attempted to inoculate another with smallpox could be imprisoned for a month.

The 1871 Act
In 1871 another Act was passed appointing a Vaccination Officer, also authorising a defendant to appear in a court of law by any member of his family, or any other person authorised by him. This act also confirmed the principle of compulsion, which evidently sparked hostility and opposition to the practice.

The 1874 Act
An Act of 1874 clarified the role of the Local Government Board in making regulations for guardians to implement the 1871 act.

The 1889 Royal Commission
A Royal Commission was established in 1889, which issued six reports between 1892 and 1896. Its recommendations, including the abolition of cumulative penalties and the use of safer vaccine, were incorporated into the 1898 Vaccination Act.

The 1898 and 1907 Acts
In 1898 a new vaccination law was passed, in some respects modifying, but not superseding, previous Acts, giving conditional exemption of conscientious objectors, (and substituting calf lymph for humanised lymph). It removed cumulative penalties and introduced a conscience clause, allowing parents who did not believe vaccination was efficacious or safe to obtain a certificate of exemption.

The Vaccination Act of 1898 purported to give liberty of non-vaccination, but this liberty was not really obtained. Parents applying for a certificate of exemption had to satisfy two magistrates, or one stipendiary, of their conscientious objections. Some stipendiaries, and many of the magistrates, refused to be satisfied, and imposed delays. Unless the exemption was obtained before the child was four months old, it was too late. The consequence was that in the year 1906, only about 40,000 exemptions were obtained in England and Wales. In the year 1907 the Government recognised that the magistrates had practically declined to carry out the law of 1898, and, consequently, a new law, the Vaccination Act 1907 (7 Edw. VII c. 31), was passed. Under this law the parent escaped penalties for the non-vaccination of his child if within four months from the birth he made a statutory declaration that he confidently believed that vaccination would be prejudicial to the health of the child, and within seven days thereafter delivered, or sent by post, the declaration to the Vaccination Officer of the district.

References

Further reading
 
 
 

Acts of the Parliament of the United Kingdom
Medical controversies in the United Kingdom
Smallpox vaccines
Health law in the United Kingdom
Vaccine controversies
Vaccination law